Bionic is the debut album of the 1990s Canadian rock band, Sandbox. The album was recorded at Metalworks Studios between January and February 1995. It was released in 1995 on Latitude Records, a short-lived independent label from St. John's, Newfoundland and Labrador founded by local music promoter Frederick Brokenshire and run out of his Fred's Records music store. An enhanced edition was later released in 1996.

The album's first single, "Curious", reached #34 on Canada's RPM Singles chart and #8 on Canada's Alternative chart. The song also received regular airplay on MuchMusic. Videos were later also released for the singles "Collide" and "Here and There".

Track listing
All Songs Written By Sandbox, except where noted.
 "Intro" – 0:15  
 "Curious" – 3:56 
 "Collide" – 3:38
 "For You" – 3:41 
 "Decisions" – 4:29
 "Grief" – 4:21 
 "Three Balloons and a Trapdoor" – 3:24  (Nicole Frosst, Mike Smith) 	 
 "Here and There" – 3:20  	 
 "Live" – 4:13 
 "Flux" – 4:16 
 "Weatherman" – 2:47	  	 
 "Lustre" – 3:19

Personnel
Paul Murray – vocals, kazoo
Scott MacFarlande – bass, bells, vocals
Troy Shanks – drums, piano, vocals
Mike Smith – guitar, vocals
Jason Archibald – guitar, vocals

References

1995 debut albums
Sandbox (band) albums
Albums recorded at Metalworks Studios